Susmita Bagchi (née Panda) is an Odia writer who writes in Odia and English. She has published numerous books of novels short-stories and travelogues. She is the daughter of Sakuntala Panda, a prominent Odia writer and founder of Odia women's monthly Sucharita. She is best known for her short story collection Akasha Jeunthi Katha for which she won Odisha Sahitya Akademi Award in 1992. She is currently heading the Mo school programme.

Personal life

She was born on 25 September 1960 at Cuttack. Her mother Sakuntala Panda was a prominent Odia writer. She did her education in Odisha before  her post-graduation in political science and did a stint as a lecturer at Delhi University. She met her future husband Subroto Bagchi when she was fifteen years old. They tied the knot 4 years later.

Career

She wrote her first short story for Sucharita 1982. Her first short story collection Akasha Jeunthi Katha was published in 1990.She followed up with Chhai Sepakhe Manisha. Her Odia novel “Deba Shishu” was about children living with cerebral palsy, It was published in 2006. It was translated into English and published by Penguin as “Children of a Better God” in 2010. She was appointed to head the Mo school programme of Government of Odisha that aims at improving the government and government aided schools in the state.

Published works

References

1960 births
Living people
People from Cuttack
Odia-language writers
Odia short story writers
Odia novelists
Novelists from Odisha
Women writers from Odisha
Odisha academics
Women educators from Odisha
Educators from Odisha
Indian women academics
Indian women novelists
Indian women short story writers
Translators from English
Recipients of the Odisha Sahitya Akademi Award
20th-century Indian short story writers
20th-century Indian novelists
20th-century Indian women writers
21st-century Indian novelists
21st-century Indian short story writers
21st-century Indian women writers